Delon Reginald Wright (born April 26, 1992) is an American professional basketball player for the Washington Wizards of the National Basketball Association (NBA). He played college basketball for the Utah Utes and was a first-team all-conference player in the Pac-12 in 2014 and 2015. He also earned the Bob Cousy Award in 2015.

High school and junior college

Born in Los Angeles, California, Wright led Leuzinger High School to the California state championship as a senior and was named CIF Southern Section Division 1A Player of the Year.  Despite his high school success, academics led him to enroll at California Community College Athletic Association (CCCAA) school the City College of San Francisco.  After two successful seasons there, he committed to Utah over Washington, Washington State, Gonzaga and Saint Mary's, despite the Utes winning only 6 games the previous season.

College career
In his first season at Utah, Wright immediately became one of the top players in the Pac-12 Conference. He finished in the top 10 in the conference in scoring (seventh at 16.9 points per game), assists (third at 4.89), steals (first at 2.56), blocked shots (sixth at 1.3), field goal percentage (third at 56.1 percent) and free throw percentage (ninth at 80.5 percent).  Wright additionally averaged 6.8 rebounds per game, despite playing the guard position. At the conclusion of the 2013–14 season, Wright became the first Ute to be named first-team All-Pac-12 and was also named to the league's All-Defensive team. Following the season, Wright considered entering the 2014 NBA draft, but ultimately decided to return to Utah for his senior season.

At the start of his senior season, Wright was named to the 50-man watch lists for the Naismith College Player of the Year and the John R. Wooden Award. For the second-straight season, he was voted first-team All-Pac-12 and again named to the Pac-12 All-Defensive Team. Wright was also a two-time member of the Pac-12 All-Defensive team and won the 2015 Bob Cousy Award.

Wright became the first player in Utah men's basketball history to be named to the first-team All-Pac-12 in consecutive years (2014 and 2015).

Professional career

Toronto Raptors (2015–2019)
On June 25, 2015, Wright was selected with the 20th overall pick in the 2015 NBA draft by the Toronto Raptors. On July 3, 2015, he signed his rookie scale contract with the Raptors and joined the team for the 2015 NBA Summer League. On April 8, 2016, with All-Stars DeMar DeRozan and Kyle Lowry rested, Wright scored a season-high 19 points in a 111–98 win over the Indiana Pacers. During his rookie season, he had multiple assignments with Raptors 905 of the NBA Development League.

Wright missed much of the 2016–17 season with a right shoulder injury. He also had multiple assignments to Raptors 905.

On January 3, 2018, Wright set career highs with 25 points and 13 rebounds in a 124–115 win over the Chicago Bulls. He had his first career double-double and hit four 3-pointers to lead the second unit.

Memphis Grizzlies (2019)
On February 7, 2019, Wright, C. J. Miles, Jonas Valančiūnas and a 2024 second-round draft pick were traded to the Memphis Grizzlies in exchange for Marc Gasol. On April 5, he scored a career-high 26 points in a 122–112 victory over the Dallas Mavericks. He also recorded his first career triple-double adding 14 assists and 10 rebounds. Two days later, on April 7, Wright posted his second triple-double with 20 points, 12 assists and 13 rebounds in a 129–127 victory over the Dallas Mavericks. On April 10, Wright posted his third triple-double with 13 points, 11 rebounds and 11 assists in a 132–117 win over the Golden State Warriors.

Dallas Mavericks (2019–2020)
On July 8, 2019, Wright was acquired by the Dallas Mavericks in a sign-and-trade deal with the Memphis Grizzlies in exchange for two-second-round picks and the draft rights to Satnam Singh.

Detroit Pistons (2020–2021)
On November 27, 2020, Wright was traded to the Detroit Pistons in a three-team trade involving the Oklahoma City Thunder, who received Trevor Ariza from Detroit and two second round picks from Dallas.  On January 25, 2021, Wright set a career high with 28 points in a 119-104 win over the Philadelphia 76ers.

Sacramento Kings (2021)
On March 25, 2021, Wright was traded to the Sacramento Kings in exchange for Cory Joseph and two future second-round draft picks.

Atlanta Hawks (2021–2022)
On August 7, 2021, Wright was traded to the Atlanta Hawks in a three-team trade with the Boston Celtics.

Washington Wizards (2022–present)
Wright signed a two-year, $16 million contract with the Washington Wizards on July 6, 2022.

Career statistics

NBA

Regular season

|-
| style="text-align:left;"| 
| style="text-align:left;"| Toronto
| 27 || 1 || 8.5 || .450 || .385 || .743 || 1.4 || 1.1 || .3 || .1 || 3.8
|-
| style="text-align:left;"| 
| style="text-align:left;"| Toronto
| 27 || 0 || 16.5 || .422 || .333 || .764 || 1.8 || 2.1 || 1.0 || .4 || 5.6
|-
| style="text-align:left;"| 
| style="text-align:left;"| Toronto
| 69 || 4 || 20.8 || .465 || .366 || .829 || 2.9 || 2.9 || 1.0 || .5 || 8.0
|-
| style="text-align:left;"| 
| style="text-align:left;"| Toronto
| 49 || 2 || 18.3 || .433 || .333 || .869 || 2.6 || 2.2 || .9 || .3 || 6.9
|-
| style="text-align:left;"| 2018–19
| style="text-align:left;"| Memphis
| 26 || 11 || 30.8 || .434 || .256 || .742 || 5.4 || 5.3 || 1.6 || .6 || 12.2
|-
| style="text-align:left;"| 
| style="text-align:left;"| Dallas
| 73 || 5 || 21.5 || .462 || .370 || .770 || 3.8 || 3.3 || 1.2 || .3 || 6.9
|-
| style="text-align:left;"| 
| style="text-align:left;"| Detroit
| 36 || 31 || 29.2 || .464 || .348 || .789 || 4.6 || 5.0 || 1.6 || .5 || 10.4
|-
| style="text-align:left;"| 
| style="text-align:left;"| Sacramento
| 27 || 8 || 25.8 || .462 || .398 || .833 || 3.9 || 3.6 || 1.6 || .4 || 10.0
|-
| style="text-align:left;"| 
| style="text-align:left;"| Atlanta
| 77 || 8 || 18.9 || .454 || .379 || .857 || 2.9 || 2.4 || 1.2 || .2 || 4.4
|- class="sortbottom"
| style="text-align:center;" colspan="2"| Career
| 411 || 70 || 20.9 || .453 || .354 || .799 || 3.2 || 3.0 || 1.2 || .4 || 7.2

Playoffs

|-
| style="text-align:left;"| 2016
| style="text-align:left;"| Toronto
| 9 || 0 || 4.6 || .300 || .000 || .615 || .4 || .3 || .3 || .0 || 1.6
|-
| style="text-align:left;"| 2017
| style="text-align:left;"| Toronto
| 9 || 0 || 10.2 || .529 || .333 || .714 || 1.4 || 1.4 || .4 || .1 || 2.8
|-
| style="text-align:left;"| 2018
| style="text-align:left;"| Toronto
| 10 || 0 || 21.5 || .456 || .429 || .938 || 2.2 || 2.3 || 1.5 || .9 || 8.6
|-
| style="text-align:left;"| 2020
| style="text-align:left;"| Dallas
| 4 || 0 || 13.3 || .600 || .500 || .600 || 0.8 || 1.8 || 1.3 || .0 || 4.0
|-
| style="text-align:left;"| 2022
| style="text-align:left;"| Atlanta
| 5 || 0 || 27.4 || .517 || .385 || .667 || 4.8 || 2.8 || .8 || .2 || 8.2
|- class="sortbottom"
| style="text-align:center;" colspan="2"| Career
| 37 || 0 || 14.5 || .478 || .395 || .740 || 1.8 || 1.6 || .8 || .3 || 4.9

College

|-
|style="text-align:left;"|2013–14
|style="text-align:left;"|Utah
| 33 || 33 || 36.4 || .561 || .222 || .793 || 6.8 || 5.3 || 2.5 || 1.3 || 15.5
|-
|style="text-align:left;"|2014–15
|style="text-align:left;"|Utah
| 35 || 35 || 33.3 || .509 || .356 || .836 || 4.9 || 5.1 || 2.1 || 1.0 || 14.5
|- class="sortbottom"
| style="text-align:center;" colspan="2"| Career
| 68 || 68 || 34.8 || .535 || .299 || .814 || 5.8 || 5.2 || 2.3 || 1.1 || 15.0

Personal life
Wright is the younger brother of former NBA player Dorell Wright.

References

External links

Utah Utes bio

1992 births
Living people
All-American college men's basketball players
American expatriate basketball people in Canada
American men's basketball players
Atlanta Hawks players
Basketball players from Los Angeles
City College of San Francisco Rams men's basketball players
Dallas Mavericks players
Detroit Pistons players
Memphis Grizzlies players
Point guards
Raptors 905 players
Sacramento Kings players
Shooting guards
Toronto Raptors draft picks
Toronto Raptors players
Utah Utes men's basketball players
Washington Wizards players